The 1919–20 Scottish Districts season is a record of all the rugby union matches for Scotland's district teams.

History

Edinburgh District beat Glasgow District in the Inter-City match.

Results

Inter-City

Glasgow District:

Edinburgh District:

Other Scottish matches

Cities District:

Provinces District:

Trial matches

Scotland Probables:

Scotland Possibles:

English matches

No other District matches played.

International matches

No touring matches this season.

References

1919–20 in Scottish rugby union
Scottish Districts seasons